Eupithecia consortaria is a moth in the  family Geometridae. It is found in Russia, Japan and Korea.

The wingspan is about 18 mm. The ground colour of the wings is greyish with a faint brownish tinge and dark markings on the costa.

References

Moths described in 1897
consortaria
Moths of Asia